Oecanthus rufescens, known as the striped tree cricket, is a species of tree cricket from Asia.

References

rufescens
Orthoptera of Asia
Insects described in 1838
Taxa named by Jean Guillaume Audinet-Serville